The Northern Kimberley, an interim Australian bioregion, is located in the northern Kimberley region of Western Australia, comprising .

It is composed of two recognised sub-regions: Mitchell and Berkeley subregions.

See also

Geography of Australia

References

Further reading
 Thackway, R and I D Cresswell (1995) An interim biogeographic regionalisation for Australia : a framework for setting priorities in the National Reserves System Cooperative Program Version 4.0 Canberra : Australian Nature Conservation Agency, Reserve Systems Unit, 1995. 

IBRA regions
Kimberley (Western Australia)
Kimberley tropical savanna
Northern Australia